Sir Edward Ayscough (c. 1618 – 13 August 1668) was an English politician who sat in the House of Commons from 1659 to his death.

Ayscough was born at South Kelsey, Lincolnshire, the son of Sir Edward Ayscough. He was educated at Westminster School and at Lincoln. He was admitted at Sidney Sussex College, Cambridge on 16 September 1635 at the age of 17. In 1659, he was elected Member of Parliament for Great Grimsby for the Third Protectorate Parliament. He was knighted in 1660. In 1665 he was High Sheriff of Lincolnshire.

Ayscough died in 1668 at the age of approximately 50. He was the father of Edward Ayscough who was also MP for Grimsby.

References

1610s births
1668 deaths
People from West Lindsey District
People educated at Westminster School, London
Alumni of Sidney Sussex College, Cambridge
Members of the Parliament of England for Great Grimsby
English MPs 1659
High Sheriffs of Lincolnshire